In Ho Lee (born 1955) is the third and previous Presiding Grand Master of Songahm Taekwondo, the American Taekwondo Association.

In Ho Lee was born in Seoul City, Korea, two years after the end of the Korean War. He began to study and practice Taekwondo as a boy.

In 1976, following a year of military service, he joined his brother, Haeng Ung Lee's Songahm Taekwondo school, in the United States. In Ho Lee became known for his jump round kick and lightning speed.

In Ho Lee was inaugurated during the 2011 Songahm Taekwondo World Championships' - Inaugural Ceremony on Saturday, June 25th, 2011 in North Little Rock, Arkansas.

In Ho Lee was succeeded by Presiding Grand Master G.K. Lee on Saturday, June 14th, 2019 in North Little Rock, Arkansas

References 

Living people
1955 births
South Korean male taekwondo practitioners
Sportspeople from Seoul